The Armenian Catholic Apostolic Exarchate of Latin America and Mexico (América Latina e México) is a pre-diocesan missionary jurisdiction of the Armenian Catholic Church sui iuris (Armenian Rite in Armenian language) in parts of Latin America.

It is exempt, i.e. directly dependent on Rome (notably the Roman Congregation for the Oriental Churches), not part of any ecclesiastical province.

It has a cathedral episcopal: Catedral Armênia São Gregório Iluminador, São Paulo, Brazil and a Co-cathedral: Nuestra Señora de Bzommar, Montevideo, Uruguay.

History 

 Established on 3 July 1981 as Apostolic Exarchate of Latin America and Mexico, on territory previously without Ordinary of the particular church.
 Lost territory  on 18 February 1989 to establish the Eparchy of San Gregorio de Narek en Buenos Aires (Argentina), restricting itself to Brazil, Uruguay and Mexico.

Ordinaries 
(all Armenian Rite)

''Apostolic Exarchs of Latin America and Mexico (América Latina e México)
 Vartán Waldir Boghossian, S.D.B. (3 July 1981 – 4 July 2018), initially Titular Bishop of Mardin of the Armenians (1981.07.03 – 1989.02.18), later Eparchial Bishop of Eparchy of San Gregorio de Narek en Buenos Aires (Argentina) (1989.02.18 – 2018.07.04.), temporarily Procurator at Rome of the Armenian Catholics (2001 – 2002)
 Pablo Hakimian (since 4 July 2018), Eparchial Bishop of Eparchy of San Gregorio de Narek en Buenos Aires

See also 
 Catholic Church in Armenia
 Catholic Church in Latin America

References

 GCatholic

External links 
 http://www.catholic-hierarchy.org/diocese/damer.html

Armenian diaspora
Armenian Catholic Church
Armenian Catholic
Armenian Catholic
Eastern Catholic dioceses in Uruguay